Ajor Band (also Romanized as Ājor Band and Ajarband; also known as Adzharband and Ājorboneh) is a village in Eqbal-e Gharbi Rural District, in the Central District of Qazvin County, Qazvin Province, Iran. At the 2006 census, its population was 270, in 70 families.

References 

Populated places in Qazvin County